Hollywood: The Fabulous Era is a 1962 American film directed by Jack Haley Jr.

Plot summary

Cast
Lauren Bacall as herself (archive footage)
Ingrid Bergman as herself (archive footage)
Humphrey Bogart as himself (archive footage)
Gary Cooper as himself (archive footage)
Henry Fonda as Host
Alan Ladd as himself (archive footage)
Marilyn Monroe as herself (archive footage)
Rosalind Russell as herself (archive footage)
Robert Taylor as himself (archive footage)
Lana Turner as herself (archive footage)
John Wayne as himself (archive footage)

Soundtrack

External links

1962 films
Documentary films about Hollywood, Los Angeles
Television shows directed by Jack Haley Jr.
1960s English-language films
American documentary films
1960s American films